Etjosuchus is an extinct genus of "rauisuchian" (loricatan) archosaur from the Triassic of Namibia. It is known from a single species, Etjosuchus recurvidens, which is based on a partial skeleton from the Ladinian or Carnian-age Omingonde Formation.

Classification 
To evaluate the evolutionary position of Etjosuchus in a modern context, Tolchard et al. (2021) coded it into a phylogenetic matrix derived from the work of Nesbitt (2011). The phylogenetic analysis was run with several levels of implied weighting (from no weighting to k=1, 3, and 6), a strategy to minimize the effects of homoplasy (convergent evolution). With no weighting, Etjosuchus is resolved as a basal loricatan closer to crocodylomorphs than Luperosuchus, but not as close as a Heptasuchus + Batrachotomus clade. At k=1, its position shifts crownward towards crocodylomorphs, and Etjosuchus may clade with Fasolasuchus and/or Rauisuchus. Increasing the weighting further strengthens a connection with Rauisuchus, crownward of Fasolasuchus. This would indicate that the family Rauisuchidae is a paraphyletic grade rather than a clade: Postosuchus and Polonosuchus, other proposed rauisuchids, were closer to crocodylomorphs than to Rauisuchus in this configuration.

References

Paracrocodylomorphs
Triassic reptiles of Africa
Fossils of Namibia
Fossil taxa described in 2021
Prehistoric pseudosuchian genera